Neza-e Olya (also Romanized as Nezā‘-e ‘Olyā) is a village in Mishan Rural District, Mahvarmilani District, Mamasani County, Fars Province, Iran. At the 2006 census, its population was 56, in 15 families.

References 

Populated places in Mamasani County